Diana Enache and Daniëlle Harmsen are the defending champions.
Diana married this year and her name changed to Buzean.

Buzean and Harmsen successfully defended their title, defeating Corinna Dentoni and Justine Ozga 6–2, 6–0 in the final.

Seeds

Draw

Draw

References
 Main Draw

TEAN International - Doubles
2012 Women's Doubles